This is a list of films produced by Fox Searchlight Pictures (now Searchlight Pictures) beginning in 2000 up until 2009.

References 

Disney-related lists
Lists of films by studio
American films by studio